Seric is a South Slavic surname. Notable people with the surname include:

 Anthony Šerić (born 1979), Australia-born Croatian soccer player
 Andrea Šerić (born 1985), Croatian handball player

See also
 Šarić

Slavic-language surnames